The Tristel Formation is a stratigraphic formation of the northern-central Alps, deposited between the late Barremian and the early Aptian of the Early Cretaceous. It consists of thickly banked limestones, marls and shales. It is the lowest formation of the Bündnerschiefer and belongs to the Rhenodanubic Group.

Outcrops can be found in the Engadin window, the Tauern window, the Rechnitz window, and many localities of the Penninic realm of the eastern and western Alps.

The type locality is the area around the Naafkopf in the border region of Austria, Liechtenstein and Switzerland.

The Tristel Formation can be correlated with the Klus Formation in Graubünden and the Couches de l’Aroley Formation in Savoie (France) and Valais (Switzerland).

References 

Geologic formations of Austria
Geologic formations of Germany
Geologic formations of Switzerland
Geology of Liechtenstein
Lower Cretaceous Series of Europe
Cretaceous Austria
Cretaceous Germany
Cretaceous Switzerland
Aptian Stage
Barremian Stage
Limestone formations
Marl formations
Shale formations
Geology of the Alps